Svartisen is a collective term for two glaciers located in Nordland county in northern Norway. It is part of Saltfjellet-Svartisen National Park, located in the Saltfjell mountain range. The glaciers are located in the municipalities of Beiarn, Meløy, Rana, and Rødøy. The two glaciers are:
 
(There are larger glaciers on Svalbard.)

There are also a number of minor glaciers in the area surrounding Svartisen, such as Glombreen in the northern part of Meløy, and Simlebreen in Beiarn. The Norwegian Water Resources and Energy Directorate has monitored the glacier mass balance of the glacier since 1970 and operates a sub-glacial laboratory beneath Engabreen.

Water from the glacier is collected and used for hydropower production via runoff into the streams and lakes and through intakes bored beneath Engabreen.

Name
The first element is svart which means 'swart' or 'black' and the last element is the finite form of is meaning 'ice' or 'glacier'. The old ice of the glacier is considerably darker than fresh ice and newfallen snow.

Western Svartisen

The western Svartisen ice cap is a glacier occupying  of the coastal area of central Norway, just inside the Arctic Circle. Most of the glacier is around 1000 metres above sea level on a high plateau. The ice cap owes its existence to the high snowfall rates in the region, rather than the cold temperatures, similar to other glaciers close by such as the Jostedalsbreen glacier. The surface on the top of the plateau feeds many outlet glaciers, including the Engabreen glacier. The status of the glacier is unknown, although some of the outlet glaciers are advancing and gaining ice mass.

Media gallery

See also
List of glaciers in Norway

References

Further reading
Svartisen, Scott Polar Research Institute, Department of Geography, University of Cambridge
Glacier changes at Svartisen, northern Norway, during the last 125 years: Influence of climate and other factors, Wilfred H. Theakstone, Journal of Earth Science, 21, 123–136, 26 March 2010. DOI: https://doi.org/10.1007/s12583-010-0011-6
Geodetic mass balance of the western Svartisen ice cap, Norway, in the periods 1968–1985 and 1985–2002, Torborg Haug, Cecilie Rolstad, Hallgeir Elvehøy, Miriam Jackson and Ivar Maalen-Johansen, Annals of Glaciology, Volume 50, Issue 50, 2009, pp. 119-125, DOI: https://doi.org/10.3189/172756409787769528

External links

Direktoratet for naturforvaltning

Glaciers of Nordland
Ice caps
Beiarn
Meløy
Rana, Norway
Rødøy